Melanie Gutteridge is an English actress, best known for playing PC Emma Keane in The Bill. She made two appearances in Not Going Out playing Amy.

Biography
Gutteridge was born in Waltham Forest, Essex, and studied at the Webber Douglas Academy of Dramatic Art from 1994 to 1997. She is married to actor Rufus Wright, who guest starred in a 2008 episode of The Bill.

Career

Television and films

Theatre
Gutteridge's appearances include in the original productions of the Alan Ayckbourn plays Drowning on Dry Land and Private Fears in Public Places in 2004–2005.

References

External links
 

Living people
English television actresses
English soap opera actresses
Alumni of the Webber Douglas Academy of Dramatic Art
Year of birth missing (living people)